The black-hooded antshrike (Thamnophilus bridgesi) is a species of bird in the family Thamnophilidae. It is found in Costa Rica and Panama. Its natural habitats are subtropical or tropical moist lowland forests, subtropical or tropical mangrove forests, and heavily degraded former forest.

The black-hooded antshrike was described by the English zoologist Philip Sclater in 1856 and given its current binomial name Thamnophilus bridgesi.

References

Further reading

black-hooded antshrike
Birds of Costa Rica
Birds of Panama
black-hooded antshrike
black-hooded antshrike
Taxonomy articles created by Polbot
Isthmian–Pacific moist forests